was a town located in Higashitonami District, Toyama Prefecture, Japan.

As of 2003, the town had an estimated population of 9,658 and a population density of 148.52 persons per km². The total area was 65.03 km².

On November 1, 2004, Jōhana, along with the towns of Fukuno and Inami, the villages of Inokuchi, Kamitaira, Taira and Toga (all from Higashitonami District), and the town of Fukumitsu (from Nishitonami District), was merged to create the city of Nanto.

The town in the anime True Tears is modeled after Jōhana.

References

External links
 Nanto City official website 

Dissolved municipalities of Toyama Prefecture
Nanto, Toyama